Brachyprosopus is an extinct genus of dicynodont therapsid from the middle Permian Tapinocephalus Assemblage Zone in the Abrahamskraal Formation belonging to the Beaufort Group of the Karoo Basin, South Africa.

Chelydontops Cluver, 1975, based on a skull from the Karoo Basin of South Africa, is a junior synonym.

Description 
Brachyprosopus is similar to Endothiodon, Niassodon, and Pristerodon in having absence of anterior median palatal ridges; maxillary tooth rows bounded laterally by a shelf; unfused vomers; raised margins of the interpterygoid vacuity; broad intertemporal region; pineal boss; dentary tables; and a long, wide posterior dentary sulcus that extends posterior to the dentary teeth. However, it can be distinguished by the autapomorphy of a curled lateral edge of the squamosal that forms a lateral wall of the external adductor fossa.

See also 
 List of therapsids

References

External links 
 The main groups of non-mammalian synapsids at Mikko's Phylogeny Archive

Dicynodonts
Permian synapsids of Africa
Fossils of South Africa
Fossil taxa described in 1937
Fossil taxa described in 1975
Taxa named by Everett C. Olson
Anomodont genera